Esad Kuhinja (born 10 August 1963) is a former Bosnian footballer.

Club career
He started his career playing with Jasen Brodarevo. Then he played OFK Titograd, FK Metalac, NK Čelik Zenica and FK Napredak Kruševac before moving to Germany where he played with SC Preußen Münster.

References

1963 births
Living people
People from Prijepolje
Yugoslav footballers
Bosnia and Herzegovina footballers
Association football defenders
OFK Titograd players
FK Metalac Gornji Milanovac players
FK Trepča players
NK Čelik Zenica players
FK Napredak Kruševac players
SC Preußen Münster players
Yugoslav First League players
First League of Serbia and Montenegro players
Regionalliga players
Bosnia and Herzegovina expatriate footballers
Expatriate footballers in Serbia and Montenegro
Bosnia and Herzegovina expatriate sportspeople in Serbia and Montenegro
Expatriate footballers in Germany
Bosnia and Herzegovina expatriate sportspeople in Germany